Pori is the fifth album by the Finnish experimental rock band Circle. It is named after the home town of the band, Pori in southern Finland, and the sleevenotes contain a number of historical and geographical facts about the city. It was originally released on Metamorphos Records in 1998, before receiving a US release on Feldspar Records in 2000.

Track listing
 Perustamisasiakirja 8.3.1558 (3:40)
 Vesitorni/Kaupunginsairaala (8:08)
 Back To Pori (4:58)
 Suurpalo (2:08)
 Kartano (7:24)
 Promenaadikeskus (7:25)
 Kruuna Päähä Pori Kuningas (9:04)
 Seisomakatsomo (2:48)
 Karhun Kansaa 1. (5:50)
 Porin Jazzjuhlat -65 (13:49)

Personnel
T. Elo – guitars, vocals
T. Harrivaara – bass guitar, double bass
J. Lehtisalo – guitars, keyboards, vocals
T. Niemelä – keyboards, stick
J. Peltomäki – drums
V. Raitio – percussion

Circle (band) albums
Concept albums
1998 albums